Quills is a 2000 period film directed by Philip Kaufman and adapted from the Obie award-winning 1995 play by Doug Wright, who also wrote the original screenplay. Inspired by the life and work of the Marquis de Sade, Quills re-imagines the last years of the Marquis's incarceration in the insane asylum at Charenton. It stars Geoffrey Rush as de Sade, Kate Winslet as laundress Madeleine "Maddie" LeClerc, Joaquin Phoenix as the Abbé de Coulmier, and Michael Caine as Dr. Royer-Collard.

Well received by critics, Quills garnered numerous accolades for Rush, including nominations for an Oscar, BAFTA and a Golden Globe. The film was a modest art house success, averaging $27,709 per screen its debut weekend, and eventually grossing $17,989,277 internationally. Cited by historians as factually inaccurate, Quills filmmakers and writers said they were not making a biography of de Sade, but exploring issues such as censorship, pornography, sex, art, mental illness, and religion.

Plot
Quills begins in Paris during the Reign of Terror, with the incarcerated Marquis de Sade penning a story about the libidinous Mademoiselle Renard, a ravishing young aristocrat who meets the imprisoned sadist.

Several years later, the Marquis is confined to the asylum for the insane at Charenton, overseen by the enlightened Abbé du Coulmier. The Marquis has been publishing his work through laundress Madeleine "Maddy" LeClerc, who smuggles manuscripts through an anonymous horseman to a publisher. The Marquis' latest work, Justine, is published on the black market to great success. Emperor Napoléon I Bonaparte orders all copies of the book to be torched and the author shot, but his advisor, Delbené, tempers this contentious idea with one of his own: send alienist Dr. Royer-Collard to assess Charenton and silence the Marquis. Meanwhile, the Abbé teaches Madeleine to read and write, while they resist their growing mutual attraction. Madeleine reads the Marquis de Sade's stories to her fellow workers. Whilst Madeleine is fascinated with the Marquis de Sade she remains reluctant to give in to his advances. The Abbé and Marquis converse on the Marquis' inappropriate advances on young women.

Royer-Collard arrives, informing the Abbé that the Marquis' "therapeutic writings" have been distributed for public consumption. He presents the Abbé with the ultimatum of silencing the Marquis or Charenton will be shut down by order of the Emperor. The Abbé rejects Royer-Collard's offers of several aggressive archaic "treatments" and asks to speak with the Marquis himself, who promptly swears obedience (winking at Madeleine through a peephole). Royer-Collard takes his leave for the time being and travels to the Panthemont Convent in Paris to retrieve his promised bride, the underage orphan Simone. They are given a run-down chateau by the Emperor, with a handsome young architect, Prioux, on hand for its renovation. On their wedding night, Royer-Collard violently rapes her, and afterward keeps her as a virtual prisoner in their home.

The hasty marriage incites much gossip at the asylum, prompting the Marquis to write a farce to be performed at a public exhibition, which Royer-Collard and Simone attend. The audacious play, a parody of the good doctor's own misogynist domination of his virginal bride, is titled "The Crimes of Love". The performance is interrupted when the inmate Bouchon molests Madeleine off-stage, prompting her to hit him in the face with an iron. The Abbé is seen publicly comforting Madeleine. Royer-Collard shuts down the public theater and demands that the Abbé do more to control the Marquis, or he will inform the ministry that the inmates are running the asylum. Infuriated, the Abbé confiscates the Marquis' quills and ink. The Marquis's wife visits him and he takes out his frustration at not being able to write on her; she retaliates by asking a surprised Royer-Collard that the Marquis be entombed forever.

They discuss that the ill-gotten gains from the Marquis's books could be used to effect his salvation, in other words, provide forms of restraint. The lack of writing implements results in more subversive behaviour from the Marquis, including a story written in wine on bedsheets and in blood on clothing. This results in further deprivation, eventually leaving the Marquis naked in an empty cell. Charlotte, one of the maids, reveals that Madeleine has been helping the Marquis. Madeleine is whipped on the order of Royer-Collard until the Abbé stops him by offering himself instead. The Abbé decides that Madeleine must be sent away. That night she visits his chamber to beg him to reconsider sending her away and confesses her love for him in the process, prompting him to kiss her passionately. They abruptly break away at the realization of what they are doing. Madeleine runs off and Charlotte catches the Abbé calling after her.

Meanwhile, Simone purchases a copy of Justine, seduces Prioux, and the young lovers run off to England together. She leaves behind a letter explaining her actions and her copy of Justine. Upon finding this, Royer-Collard refocuses attention upon the Marquis as the source of his troubles and embarks upon a quest for revenge by having him tortured. About to be sent away from Charenton for her role in assisting the Marquis, Madeleine begs a last story from him, which is to be relayed to her through the asylum patients. Bouchon, the inmate at the end of the relay, is excited by the story, breaks out of his cell, and attacks Madeleine. Royer-Collard hears Madeleine's screams but chooses to ignore them and she is killed by Bouchon. The asylum is set afire by the pyromaniac Dauphin and the inmates break out of their cells.

Madeleine's body is found in the laundry vat by her blind mother and the Abbé. The Abbé is devastated by Madeleine's death and Bouchon is captured and imprisoned inside an iron maiden. The Abbé blames the Marquis for Madeleine's death and confronts him; the Marquis claims he had been with Madeleine in every way imaginable, only to be told she had died a virgin, provoking an uncharacteristically emotional outpouring of grief. The Abbé has the Marquis' tongue cut out as punishment for Madeleine's death, but is stricken with remorse and whips himself. The Abbé then has a dream in which Madeleine returns to life and they have sex, but ultimately it ends with him holding her corpse. The Marquis' health declines severely, but he remains perverse as ever, decorating his dungeon with a story, using his feces as ink. As the Marquis lies dying, the Abbé reads him the last rites and offers him a crucifix to kiss. The Marquis defiantly swallows the crucifix and chokes to death on it.

A year later, the new Abbé arrives at Charenton and is given the grand tour by Royer-Collard. During the tour, they meet the maid Charlotte, and through the exchange between herself and Royer-Collard, it is apparent that there is a connection. The asylum has been converted into a print shop, with the inmates as its staff. The books being printed are the works of the Marquis de Sade. At the end of the tour, the new Abbé meets his predecessor, who resides in the Marquis' old cell. Yearning to write, he begs paper and a quill from the new Abbé, and tries to strangle Royer-Collard when he ventures too close the peephole. The Abbé is herded off by Royer-Collard before he can hear any more from his predecessor. However, the peephole opens, and Madeleine's mother thrusts paper, quill, and ink through. The Abbé begins to scribble furiously, with the Marquis providing the narration.

Cast
 Geoffrey Rush as the Marquis de Sade; Director Philip Kaufman encouraged Rush to portray the Marquis as something of a dissolute rock star holed up in the Ritz Carlton. Rush used Francine du Plessix Gray's 1998 biography At Home with the Marquis de Sade: A Life as a reference and had previously acted in a production of Marat/Sade.
 Kate Winslet as Madeleine "Maddy" LeClerc; Screenwriter Doug Wright called Winslet the "patron saint" of the movie for being the first big name to back it, expressing interest as early as April 1999.
 Joaquin Phoenix as the Abbé du Coulmier; Before settling on Phoenix, casting directors considered Jude Law, Guy Pearce, and Billy Crudup for the role.
 Michael Caine as Dr. Royer-Collard; Kaufman drew comparisons between Royer-Collard and Kenneth Starr, particularly the publication of de Sade's works at the Charenton Printing Press and the release of Starr's report online.
 Billie Whitelaw as Madame LeClerc
 Stephen Marcus as Bouchon
 Amelia Warner as Simone
 Stephen Moyer as Prioux
 Jane Menelaus as Renée Pelagie
 Ron Cook as Napoléon I Bonaparte
 Patrick Malahide as Delbené
 Elizabeth Berrington as Charlotte
 Tony Pritchard as Valcour
 Michael Jenn as Cleante
 Edward Tudor-Pole as Franval

Production
The interior set of Charenton was built at Pinewood Studios, where most of the filming took place. Oxfordshire, Bedfordshire, and London stood in for the exterior shots of early 19th century France.<ref>{{cite web |url=http://www.movie-locations.com/filmarchive/q/quills.html |title=MovieLocations.com Listing for Quills' |access-date=2016-02-16 |work=MovieLocations.com Guide to Movie Locations |archive-url = https://web.archive.org/web/20061117030811/http://www.movie-locations.com/filmarchive/q/quills.html  |archive-date = 2006-11-17}}</ref> Production designer Martin Childs imagined the primary location of Charenton as an airy, though circuitous place, darkening as Royer-Collard takes over operations. The screenplay specifies the way the inmates' rooms link together, which plays a key role in the relay of the Marquis' climactic story to Madeleine. Screenwriter/playwright Doug Wright was a constant presence on set, assisting the actors and producers in interpreting the script and bringing his vision to life. Casting directors Donna Isaacson and Priscilla John recruited a number of actors from a disabled actor's company to play the parts of many of the inmates at Charenton.

Costume designer Jacqueline West created the intricate period costumes, using each character as inspiration. West previously worked with director Philip Kaufman on his crime drama Rising Sun. For Joaquin Phoenix's Abbé, costumers designed special "pleather" clogs to accommodate the actor's veganism. In one scene, Rush's Marquis de Sade wears a suit decorated in bloody script, which West described as "challenging" to make. It features actual writings of de Sade and costumers planned exactly where each sentence should go on the fabric. Before production began, West gave Winslet a copy of French painter Léopold Boilly's "Woman Ironing" to give her a feel for the character, which Winslet said greatly influenced her performance.

Music
The Quills soundtrack was released by RCA Victor on 21 November 2000 featuring the music of Oscar-winning composer Stephen Warbeck (Shakespeare in Love). Featuring experimental instrumentation on such instruments as the serpent, the mediaeval shawm, and the bucket, most reviewers were intrigued by the unconventional and thematic score. Cinemusic.net reviewer Ryan Keaveney called the album a "macabre masterpiece", with an "addicting and mesmerizing" sound. Urban Cinephile contributor Brad Green described the album as a "hedonistic pleasure" that "captures the spirit of an incorrigible, perverse genius." Soundtrack.net's Glenn McClanan disliked the "lack of unifying unified themes and motifs" that may have served each individual scene, but made the film feel "incoherent."

Track listing
 "The Marquis and the Scaffold" – 3:08
 "The Abbe and Madeleine" – 2:19
 "The Convent" – 2:22
 "Plans for a Burial" – 1:18
 "Dream of Madeleine" – 4:42
 "Royer-Collard and Bouchon" – 4:15
 "Aphrodisiac" – 2:59
 "The Last Story" – 7:35
 "The Marquis' Cell at Charenton" – 4:38
 "The End: A New Manuscript" – 7:32
 "The Printing Press" – 2:22

Though not included on the soundtrack, the opening notes of "Au Clair de la Lune", a traditional French children's song, recur throughout the film, usually hummed by the Marquis. The song is originally sung by John Hamway during the opening scene of a beheading which was filmed in Oxford. The English translation provides some illumination as to its selection as a theme for the Marquis:

By the light of the moon,
My friend Pierrot,
Lend me your quill, 
To write a word.
My candle is dead,
I have no more fire.
Open your door for me
For the love of God.

By the light of the moon,
Pierrot replied:
"I don't have any pens,
I am in my bed
Go to the neighbor's,
I think she's there
Because in her kitchen
Someone is lighting the fire..."

Release
Box office
Distributed by Fox Searchlight Pictures in 2000, Quills premiered in the United States at the Telluride Film Festival on 2 September 2000. It was given a limited release on 22 November 2000, with a wider release following on 15 December 2000. The film earned $249,383 its opening weekend in nine theaters, totaling $7,065,332 domestically and $10,923,895 internationally, for a total of $17,989,227.

Critical reception
The film holds a 75% "fresh" rating at the review aggregator site Rotten Tomatoes, based on 126 reviews, with an average rating of 6.6/10. The site's consensus states: "Though hard to watch, this film's disturbing exploration of freedom of expression is both seductive and thought-provoking." It has an average score of 70/100 at Metacritic, based on 31 reviews, indicating "generally favorable reviews".

Elvis Mitchell of The New York Times complimented the "euphoric stylishness" of Kaufman's direction and Geoffrey Rush's "gleeful... flamboyant" performance. Peter Travers for Rolling Stone wrote about the "exceptional" actors, particularly Geoffrey Rush's "scandalously good" performance as the Marquis, populating a film that is "literate, erotic, and spoiling to be heard". Stephanie Zacharek of Salon.com enthused over the "delectable and ultimately terrifying fantasy" of Quills, with Rush as "sun king", enriched by a "luminous" supporting cast.

In a December 2000 review, film critic Roger Ebert, rated it 3.5 stars out of 4 and stated, "The message of 'Quills' is perhaps that we are all expressions of our natures, and to live most successfully we must understand that."

The film was not without its detractors, including Richard Schickel of Time magazine, who decried director Philip Kaufman's approach as "brutally horrific, vulgarly unamusing", creating a film that succeeds only as "soft-gore porn". Kenneth Turan of the Los Angeles Times dismissed the picture as an "overripe contrivance masquerading as high art", while de Sade biographer Neil Schaeffer in The Guardian criticized it for historical inaccuracies and for simplifying de Sade's complex life.

AccoladesQuills received three Oscar nominations at the 73rd Academy Awards for Best Actor (Geoffrey Rush, previous winner for 1996's Shine), Art Direction (Art: Martin Childs, Sets: Jill Quertier), and Costume Design (Jacqueline West). The film was also nominated by the Hollywood Foreign Press, organizers of the Golden Globes, for Best Actor in a Drama (Geoffrey Rush) and Best Screenplay (Douglas Wright). The National Board of Review selected Quills as its Best Film of 2000.

Historical inaccuracies
Neil Schaeffer, detailed a number of disparities between fact and film. Schaeffer, whose The Marquis de Sade: A Life was used by Director Philip Kaufman as reference, in a review published in The Guardian, criticized the film for historical inaccuracies and for simplifying de Sade's complex life.

Schaeffer relates that de Sade's initial incarceration "had nothing to do with his writing" but with sexual scandals involving servants, prostitutes, and his sister-in-law. He also criticized the opening scene's implication that the reign of terror caused the "sanguinary streak" of de Sade's writing, when "his bloodiest and best work, 120 Days of Sodom, was written in the Bastille – obviously before the revolution" and not at Charenton, as suggested by the film. In contrast to the film, the historical de Sade was "not at the height of his literary career nor of his literary powers" while at Charenton, nor did he cut the "tall, trim figure of the Australian actor Geoffrey Rush" but was of middling height and, at the time, of a "considerable, even a grotesque, obesity".

The manuscripts smuggled out of the asylum were not the novel Justine, which features prominently in the film but was published thirteen years before de Sade's incarceration at the asylum. De Sade's smuggled works were not particularly outrageous, mostly consisting of conventional novels and a number of plays he worked on throughout his life in hopes of having them performed. Most of these were soundly rejected by publishers. De Sade was, in fact, involved in the theater productions at Charenton, though none like the play featured in Quills.'' The plays performed were popular, conventional Parisian dramas. The government shut the Charenton theater down on 6 May 1813, years before the real Dr. Royer-Collard had any influence at Charenton.

Schaeffer criticized also the film's treatment of de Sade's personal relations regarding his wife (who had formally separated from him after the revolution), the chambermaid (who did not serve as a liaison to a publisher but with whom he had a sexual relationship from her early teens until shortly before his death), and his "companion of many years" who had a room at Charenton (and actually smuggled out the manuscripts) but is ignored by the film. Furthermore, "De Sade's hideous death in the movie is nothing like the truth, for he died in his sleep, in his 74th year, as peacefully as any good Christian".

According to Kaufman, Doug Wright did not have the rights to the original translations and therefore had to create and write the passages of de Sade's work that are included in the original play and the film. He applied the vocabulary used in the translations to the passages to imitate de Sade's style but the archaic language comes across as funny to a modern viewer whereas in the 1700s, as stated by Kaufman, these words were "incendiary".

References

Bibliography

External links

 
 
 
 
 

2000 films
2000 biographical drama films
American biographical drama films
American independent films
British independent films
German biographical drama films
2000s English-language films
Latin-language films
Cross-dressing in American films
American erotic thriller films
Films about psychiatry
Films about the Marquis de Sade
British films based on plays
American films based on plays
Fox Searchlight Pictures films
Films critical of the Catholic Church
Films directed by Philip Kaufman
Films scored by Stephen Warbeck
Films set in France
Films set in the 19th century
Films shot in England
Films shot in London
Films shot in Oxfordshire
Necrophilia in film
Plays by Doug Wright
Films shot at Pinewood Studios
2000 drama films
Films with atheism-related themes
2000 independent films
Films shot in Bedfordshire
British biographical drama films
2000s American films
2000s British films
2000s German films